Casebook of the Black Widowers is a collection of mystery short stories by American author Isaac Asimov, featuring his fictional club of mystery solvers, the Black Widowers. It was first published in hardcover by Doubleday in January 1980 and in paperback by the Fawcett Crest imprint of Ballantine Books in March 1981.

This book is the third of six in the Black Widowers series, based on a literary dining club he belonged to known as the Trap Door Spiders.Asimov 1994, I. Asimov, chapter "120. The Trap Door Spiders". It collects twelve stories by Asimov, nine reprinted from mystery magazines and three previously unpublished, together with a general introduction and an afterword by the author following each story. Each story involves the club members' knowledge of trivia.

Contents
"Introduction" 
"The Cross of Lorraine"
"The Family Man"
"The Sports Page"
"Second Best"
"The Missing Item"
"The Next Day"
"Irrelevance!"
"None So Blind"
"The Backward Look"
"What Time Is It?"
"Middle Name"
"To the Barest"

Notes

External links
 
 

Mystery short story collections by Isaac Asimov
1980 short story collections
Doubleday (publisher) books